Who Killed the Canadian Military? is a 2004 non-fiction book by J. L. Granatstein, a Canadian historian and military veteran. It examines and critiques the dilapidated state of the Canadian military. It also argues that a well-funded and well-trained military is necessary, given the present international climate, and that increased military spending is necessary for Canada to survive as a nation. The book received mainly positive reviews from both the Canadian Military Journal and H-Net.

See also
 Who Killed Canadian History?, 1998 book by Granatstein
 Canadian military
 Canadian politics
 Canadian foreign policy

References

External links
 Official website (at HarperCollins Canada)
 Listing at Amazon.ca

2004 non-fiction books
Canadian non-fiction books
HarperCollins books